Dheeraj Sharma may refer to:

Dheeraj Sharma (professor), professor of management
Dheeraj Sharma (filmmaker) (born 1982), Indian social worker and documentary film maker